Mohamed Ali Haroun (born 8 February 1927) is an Algerian politician. He was a member of the High Council of State from 14 January 1992 to 30 January 1994.

References

1927 births
Living people
National Liberation Front (Algeria) politicians
Members of the National Liberation Front (Algeria)
21st-century Algerian people